Hoplerythrinus cinereus is a species of trahira (family Erythrinidae). It is a tropical, pelagic freshwater fish which is known from the Island of Trinidad off northeastern Venezuela. Males can reach a maximum standard length of 20.2 cm.

H. cinereus was originally described by T.N. Gill in 1858, as a species of Hoplerythrinus. It was listed as a valid species of Erythrinus by Osvaldo Takeshi Oyakawa in 2003.

References

External links
 Hoplerythrinus cinereus at www.fishwise.co.za

Erythrinidae
Taxa named by Theodore Gill
Fish described in 1858